"Minuetto" is a 1973 Italian song composed by Franco Califano (lyrics) and Dario Baldan Bembo (music) and performed by Mia Martini. It was the singer's major commercial success.

Background
In 1973 Dario Baldan Bembo composed a modern minuet ballad, and the melody was chosen by producer Giovanni Sanjust as to be the Summer single for Mia Martini, fresh from the success of "Piccolo uomo" and "Donna sola". The Albertelli version, titled "Salvami", was eventually released in 2003 in the collection Canzoni segrete. 

The all-star chorus of the song consisted of La Bionda brothers, Bruno Lauzi, Maurizio Fabrizio, Martini's sister Loredana Bertè and her then fiancé Adriano Panatta.

The song premiered in the RAI television show Adesso musica, and eventually won the Festivalbar ex aequo with "Io domani" by Marcella Bella, marking the second victory in a row for Mia Martini.   It was the major success in Martini's career, staying on the Italian single hit parade for a total of 30 weeks and reaching the second place.

The song was recorded by Mia Martini in French (with the title "Tu t'en vas quand tu veux") and Spanish and released in several foreign markets, including Japan and Brazil.

Track listing

   7" single –  	SRL 10.694
 "Minuetto" (Franco Califano, Dario Baldan Bembo)
 "Tu sei così" (Luigi Albertelli, Massimo Guantini)

Charts

References

External links 

1973 singles
Italian songs
1973 songs 
Mia Martini songs
Songs written by Dario Baldan Bembo